Global Inheritance is a 501(c)3 nonprofit organization based in Los Angeles, California. The group's initiatives draw on the transformative power of creative expression to push society towards beneficial environmental and social change. 

Since their founding in 2002 by Eric Ritz, Global Inheritance has produced interactive educational programming at major festivals, universities, and other large events catering to young audiences. The structure of their program designs allows for tailored experiences that align with the cultures of diverse audiences and distinct partnerships. 

The organization is widely known for its work in making major events such as the Coachella Valley Music and Arts Festival, ESPN X Games, and the Stagecoach Music Festival more sustainable by engaging and inspiring their audiences to do more for the planet. Relying on a range of programs, from artist-designed recycling bins and plastic surgery pop-up experiences to energy-generating playgrounds and poster design initiatives, Global Inheritance helps events reduce their environmental impact and raise awareness among attendees.

Initiatives
Global Inheritance promotes environmental education, sustainability, and social action through a lineup of custom-designed projects. Below are some of the group's most well-known initiatives.

POSTed Studio 
The POSTed Studio encourages individuals to express their opinions through poster art. POSTed amplifies the power of visual communication to everyone, regardless of artistic skill. Each participant develops a concept around a social or environmental issue that matters to them. The most creative concepts are then turned into high-quality poster prints designed by professional artists. Finished designs are made available through online download for educational and activist purposes.

Past Redesign Artists:
David "MEGGS" Hooke, Danny Schlitz, Joe Ledbetter, Kelsey Gallo, Bwana Spoons, Dan Smith, Sasha Vinogradova, Sarah Lyons, Luke McGarry, etc.

POSTed Studio :: Speaker Series 
During the Speaker Series, guests and moderators discuss important social and environmental issues that impact the globe. Audience members are encouraged to engage with the guest speaker and ask questions to learn more about the issues and inspire action. Participants are invited to create a concept poster, inspired by the talk. Guest speakers select their favorite concept posters to be redesigned by professional artists. The poster redesigns are made available online for free download.

Past speakers: 
Jayden Smith (Actor, Singer, Activist),
Blond:ish (DJ, Producer, Director of Bye-Bye Plastic
Joshua Tree National Park), 
Nic Adler (Culinary Director, Coachella Music Festival),
Sam Feldt (DJ, Producer, Entrepreneur)

Plastic Surgery: Cut Plastic Out Of Your Life 
In the Fall of 2019, Global Inheritance started giving Plastic Surgery. Plastic Surgery is, first and foremost, an educational program that seeks to teach people about our population's overconsumption of plastic products and offer advice as to how we can combat this issue. The program offers free consultation sessions for individuals looking to reduce or eliminate their single-use plastic habits. Patients receive onsite advice from an environmental scientist and a complimentary prescription to reduce their plastic intake and carbon footprint. A plastic-free pharmacy, connected to the Doctor's office, provides patients the opportunity to turn in their prescription for an item to help them jump-start their plastic-free lifestyle.

Movie Club 
Starting in March 2020, Global Inheritance has been sharing weekly recommendations for our favorite feature films and documentaries based around an important global issue. Movie Club members can join online meet-ups with experts in the field, NGOs, producers, and other leading voices from behind the scenes to discuss important takeaways and ideas from the films. After each film, Movie Club members are invited to take a short trivia quiz about the films for the opportunity to win exclusive merchandise, experiences, and more. Global Inheritance Movie Club is free to join, and all members are eligible to win prizes.

Past Films: Cowspiracy, Okja, The Ivory Game, Chasing Coral and more.
Past Speakers: Harvey Goldsmith (Organizer of Live Aid), Brandon McEachern (Broccoli City Festival Founder), Emma Rose Cohen (Final Straw Founder),  Kate Ochsman (Wildlife Conservationist), Zackary Rago (Chasing Coral), Nikki Vegan (Plant-Based Diet Influencer), to name a few.

TRASHed :: Art of Recycling
This program bridges art and environmental responsibility to bring new attention to the practice of recycling. Artists redesign empty recycling bins in order to inspire event-goers not only to recycle but also to take ownership in the larger concept of activism. The redesigned bins create artworks that Global Inheritance brings to events across the country, such as Coachella, which has supported the program since 2004. The festival has showcased over a thousand recycling bins in the last eight years, each one an original piece created by artists from around the world. Past artists have included Hunter S. Thompson, Blink-182, and Fugazi. Each year, Global Inheritance donates the decorated bins to local schools.

TRASHed :: Recycling Store
The TRASHed :: Recycling Store has reduced the environmental footprints of major events, such as Warped Tour, X Games, Virgin Music Festival, Stagecoach Festival, Outside Lands Festival, Coachella (under the title, 10 for 1 Bottle Exchange), Ultra Festival, Treasure Island, and more. Founded in 2003, the TRASHed :: Recycling Store has inspired other festivals around the globe, including Bonnaroo and Lollapalooza, to create incentive-based recycling programs. The store awards points for bottles, cans, and biodegradable cups that individuals collect in order to encourage people to keep the grounds clean. These points can be exchanged for prizes that range from Loomstate jeans and backstage passes to skateboard decks and autographed memorabilia, depending on the interests of the venue.

Energy FACTory

Launched at the 2007 Coachella Valley Music and Arts Festival, the Energy FACTory is an interactive, energy-making museum that uses different mediums to educate the public about renewable energy sources. Through installations, workshops, and demonstrations, the Energy FACTory educates people about renewable energies, such as wind, solar, bio-diesel, ethanol, thermal, and kinetic energy, as well as the truths about non-renewable energy. The Energy FACTory has featured everything from re-engineered golf carts inspired by different Coachella artists, such as an Amy Winehouse ethanol golf cart and a Yeah Yeah Yeahs biodiesel golf cart, to wind-powered clock towers, human-powered DJ Stages, and educational workshops. The size of the installation can vary from a single stationary bike or listening station to an entire playground depending on the venue.

Energy Playground

A spin-off of the Energy FACTory, first seen at Coachella 2010 under the name "Sweatshop Mixer" and also appearing as "Prius Playground," "High Plains Mixer," and "Energy FACTory DJ Mixer," the Energy Playground consists of bikes, swings, human-sized hamster wheels, seesaws, and hand cranks. All of the equipment is set up to harness the energy that is produced by using them. The energy is then converted into electricity to power anything from snow cone machines and cell phone chargers to entire DJ sets. The majority of electricity produced by the playground is stored in the Energy Well, a fully monitor-able and adaptable lithium-ion battery command center. As electricity flows from production devices into the Energy Well, software tracks all aspects of production and can share, in real-time, the results of riders' work. This incentive aims to introduce people to alternative forms of energy while at the same time realizing the impact, big or small, that they can make as one person or as a group.

The Bigger Picture
Launched in 2008, The Bigger Picture Film Awards celebrates cause-based films and documentaries chosen by the public. Participants vote online to support movies highlighting the most pressing issues of our time. Award categories are separated between feature films and documentaries. With the Bigger Picture Film Awards, each voter is encouraged to share their favorite nominees with their personal network. Every voter is automatically entered to win prizes for their involvement.

Once the votes are in, Global Inheritance hosts a ceremony in Los Angeles, California, where film producers, actors, and movie industry executives gather to receive their awards and celebrate the causes they championing. The 2017 Bigger Picture Film Awards was held at the Ace Hotel in Downtown Los Angeles on March 1.

Past programs

Tour Rider
Global Inheritance partnered with Bill Silva Presents and Andy Hewitt in 2005 to bring Tour Rider to the Hollywood Bowl in Los Angeles. Concertgoers who use public transportation to arrive at the venue can stop by the Tour Rider booth to receive prizes in exchange for their environmentally-friendly behavior. The Metro offers several options to get to the Hollywood Bowl, including a direct connection to the venue, making public transportation both a convenient and environmentally-conscious option. Prizes range from museum and event passes to eco-friendly clothing and accessories. Recent concerts that have featured the Tour Rider program include Paul McCartney, Radiohead, Roger Waters, Kings of Leon, and many more. Tour Rider rewards concertgoers for helping the environment and decreasing traffic congestion, which is especially valuable given the location of the Hollywood Bowl.

Alternative Energy Fuel RC Racing
Starting in 2006 at the ESPN X Games, Global Inheritance introduced a new program that allows participants to race miniature RC cars that run on alternative fuels/power sources. If attendees can't afford a hybrid or don't have a driver's license, at least they can race an RC cart that is powered by ethanol, biodiesel, or charged using solar. These races offer young people and adults alike the opportunity to explore the efficiency of these alternative options.

Saving Nature Arcade

Debuting at Coachella Music & Arts Festival in 2014, the Saving Nature Arcade is a solar-powered twist on 8-bit video games. Arcade classics have been re-skinned to spotlight key environmental challenges. The walls of the arcade are created using wood signage. Each wood panel is customized to highlight a different issue (including waste and recycling, water, energy, carbon footprint, urbanization, and natural resources). Some of the featured titles included No ImPact Man, Urban Frogger, Waste Invaders, Water Patrol, and The Dangerous Dig. Festival attendees received free tokens by participating in any of our Saving Nature efforts. Participants competed against other festival attendees for the chance to win backstage passes to see Arcade Fire perform. The Saving Nature Arcade encourages everyone to elevate their game in defending our environment.

Environmentaland
This theme park/environmental museum aimed to expose people of all ages to environmental issues and sustainable living through games, competitions, and exhibits. Located at the Hollywood & Highland complex, the home of the Academy Awards, Environmentaland was the first theme park of its kind. In addition to exploring the impact of global warming through desert miniature golf and touring the eco-planetarium, visitors could participate in the energy playground, which featured a seesaw and Tour de Energy bicycles that generated power. Environmentaland facilitated adventures in self-powered activities as well, such as milkshakes made on bike-powered blenders and a hand-crank Pearl Jam listening station. Environmentaland also featured numerous events, including the Bigger Picture, a series of documentaries that focused on environmental and social issues.

Oasis Water Bar
Global Inheritance worked with Coachella in 2013 to introduce a program dedicated to bringing awareness to the complexities, issues, and significance of drinking water. This Oasis Water Bar provides an opportunity for festival-goers to learn about the future of drinking water and the potential of fourteen different H2O sources. The Oasis presents its visitors with a refreshing perspective on the future of drinking water by offering shot glasses full of water from several varying sources. The Oasis has its very own bartenders/scientists who are experts in water conservation and ready to offer festival-goers a better understanding of their own water consumption. As shots are poured by the bartenders/scientists, patrons of the bar also hear the backstory of each water type, such as where it originated from, how far it traveled to get to the festival grounds, the types of filtration methods used to purify it, and more. Festival-goers can learn what they might be drinking five years, twenty years or fifty years in the future and what needs to happen to preserve certain sources. Visitors to the Oasis taste waters like Purified Wastewater, Desalinated Pacific Ocean Water, Los Angeles Tap Water, Glacier Water, Oregon Rainwater, Hot Spring Water, and more.

Global Warming Chess
Global Warming Chess immerses participants and players into a life-size game of chess where they are the chess pieces. The game is intended to demonstrate the volatile and unpredictable nature of the fight against global warming. Festival attendees were encouraged to watch as the two opposing sides maneuvered to eliminate each other and dominate the board. During each match, festival-goers competed against bands, a polar bear, or Halliburton's CEO. Donning costumes for each chess piece, participants are divided into sides representing the "causes" and "cures" of global warming. Costumes for the "causes" include Hummers as pawns, factories as rooks, coal as knights, lobbyists as bishops, trash as queen, and an oil derrick as king. "Cure" costumes include bicycles as pawns, recycling bins as rooks, solar panels as knights, scientists as bishops, a tree as queen, and a wind turbine as king. The Global Warming Chess program premiered in 2008 at the Virgin Music Festival in Toronto, Canada.

Public Displays of Affection
Public Displays Of Affection (PDA) was launched in 2006 to recreate the way people in Los Angeles view public transportation. In another combination of environmental sustainability and the arts, Global Inheritance partnered with high-profile bands to reward public transportation riders. PDA took over major venues, including Union Station in Los Angeles, that are easily accessible by public transportation. Anyone with an incoming Metro ticket or bus pass was admitted free of charge. The project aimed to prove that public transportation is a viable alternative to LA's car culture. Past concerts have included Ladytron at Hollywood and Highland and the Secret Machines with Shepard Fairey at Union Station.

Energy Battle Royal
Currently contained in a comic book, this epic battle seeks to illustrate the current energy sources competing to provide power to the world, including oil, wind, hydrogen, and ethanol. Each energy source is represented in a comic-book style superhero that embodies the advantages and disadvantages of the source. Global Inheritance introduced the various characters at Coachella 2011, further educating the public about alternative energy options, and launched its newest comic book at the Air Quality Management District Conference in March 2012.

Poltar The Great
Launched in 2015 at Coachella Arts + Music Festival, Poltar the Great is an interactive, all-knowing, all-telling Polar Bear who is driven to protect the environment. Poltar's ultimate goal is to educate participants through a one-on-one experience with his keen fortune-telling abilities. A 10-ft tall magical box is the permanent residence of Poltar the Great, and is where his animated automat provides solutions to cope with today's most pressing environmental issues. Bestowing his wisdom to participants, Poltar provides customized fortune cards depicting Mother Nature's greatest gifts (the land, the air, the water, the animals, the food, the glaciers, and others).

Recyclosaurus Rex
Introduced at Coachella 2012, Recyclosaurus Rex is a 25-foot tall/40-foot long robotic dinosaur that consumes empty water bottles, cans, and other recyclables and compacts them into small cubes of recyclable waste. Recyclosaurus Rex is not only an environmentally conscious and resourceful aid to the recycling process but has been a large attraction and destination point for many festival-goers during the Coachella Music & Arts Festival. Coachella attendees sacrifice their recyclables to stay on good terms with Recyclosaurus Rex while litterers feel the wrath of Rex for refusing to be team players.

Fire and Ice: Saving Nature World Tour
The Fire and Ice: Saving Nature World Tour followed the exploits of Super Chill and Smokin' Hot, a DJ duo consisting of a polar bear and a grizzly bear. The two furry friends found themselves in various endangered habitats as destinations of their virtual tour. Global Inheritance issued a monthly interactive update on Smokin' Hot and Super Chill and the global tour stops they DJed in. These updates are opportunities to bring attention to significant areas that represent environmental importance. Tour Destinations included Sichuan, China; Mount Everest; Borneo; Nauru; the Great Barrier Reef; Antarctica; the Amazon Rain Forest; the Galapagos Islands; the Pacific Trash Vortex; the Gulf of Mexico; the Arctic; Greenland; the Dead Sea; the Sahel; Congo; Madagascar; the Florida Everglades; Colorado River; and the Sky Islands.

Saving Nature Claw Machine
The Saving Nature Claw Machine experience raises awareness for endangered and at-risk animals through an arcade-like experience. The program combines a playful activity and an educative interaction with a message to address the extinction of dozens of animal species. By letting participants choose their "spirit animal," the program generates a sense of kin between them and leads to a broader sense of responsibility towards the animal kingdom. After researching and choosing an animal, participants take a short quiz to learn more about the endangered and at-risk species they selected. This is followed by a photo opportunity inside of a life-size claw machine, which is shared afterward onsite with action items to save their species. The last step is for the participant to take command of the claw machine and to seek out and save their animal. After the event, Global Inheritance can keep participants updated on ways to protect endangered species through messages educating them on how daily changes in their life can make a major impact. Global Inheritance also asks these individuals to get involved and support frontline protection organizations dedicated to saving the animal kingdom. The Saving Nature Claw Machine first appeared at the 2017 Coachella Music & Arts Festival.

Rain Supreme
Launched in the winter of 2016, Rain Supreme gathered some of California's best street artists to battle the worst drought in the state's history and redesign the way people save water. Participating artists included Jeff McMillian, Mearone, Bumblebeelovesyou, Teddy Kelly, Samir Evol, Drew Merritt, Christina Angelina, Levi Ponce, Vakseen, James Haunt, Clinton Bopp, Ashley Marcias, Brandon Sopinsky, Mark Ravelo, Jeremiah Garcia, Ben Swenson, Nisha Sembi, Jacob Livingood, 2Shae, Jorge Riverol, Vyal, Steve Marinez, and more. Through this program, Global Inheritance provides communities affected by water scarcity the opportunity to collect and store water to be reused for daily watering needs. Each Rain Supreme art and water conservation exhibit provides attendees the opportunity to view the Rain Supreme art collection as well as order their own rain barrels, find out about rain barrel rebate programs in their communities, and learn from water conservationists about best practices and installation tips for their homes.

Past events and partnerships

Coachella Music & Arts Festival 2004-2020
Ever since their first collaboration in 2004, Coachella Music + Arts Festival has been a platform for Global Inheritance to highlight environmental issues. Innovative and interactive experiences like TRASHed: Art of Recycling and Carpoolchella were among the first programs designed to trigger a major reaction from the festival's audience and raise awareness on sustainability issues inherent to major events. Thanks to their long-term commitment to each other, Global Inheritance and Coachella Music + Arts Festival have implemented new initiatives almost every year to continue to raise awareness among more and more festival attendees, reduce the festival's carbon footprint, and offer entertaining and educational activities for everyone. Featured programs include Portal Potties (2016), Energy FACTory Museum (2007, 2008), 18 & Up (2009) Energy FACTory DJ Mixer (2010, 2011), Recyclosaurus Rex (2012), Oasis Water Bar (2013), Saving Nature Solar Arcade (2014), Poltar the Great (2015), Polar Bear Dating Game (2016), Saving Nature Claw Machine (2017), POSTed Studio (2018), and Bear Traxx (2019).

Through its diverse portfolio of programs, Global Inheritance has always focused on improving the experience of festival attendees and participating in the unique atmosphere of Coachella Music + Arts Festival: offering people solutions to charge their phones at no cost (Energy Playground), contributing to the artistic environment of the festival site (TRASHed :: Art of Recycling), keeping the festival grounds clean (10-4-1, Recycling Store, Recyclosaurus Rex), offering merchandise or experiences as rewards (Carpoolchella, Saving Nature Claw Machine), and more. Global Inheritance has been given the opportunity and the resources to pursue its mission at Coachella Music & Arts Festival since 2004.

South Coast Air Quality Management District: A World We Can Change Expo 2013
At the A World We Can Change Expo in March 2013, Global Inheritance entertained and educated nearly 8,000 high school students and teachers with the Energy FACTory DJ Mixer, a DJ set powered by attendees of the conference using 18 bikes and two energy seesaws. Attendees also had the opportunity to run on Global Inheritance's Human Hamster Wheels for some healthy competition to power a light tower. Those who were able to light up all ten light bulbs on the tower received rewards.

Art Basel 2012
Art Basel housed Global Inheritance's Think BIG exhibit, a collaborative project with Threadless. The program invited artists from around the world to redesign miniature recycling bins with a chance to win a spot to redesign a large recycling bin for Coachella as well as a VIP pass, airfare, and accommodation for the festival. Well-known artists such as Gürkan Akkurt, Oana Botea, Jennifer Boxer, Jacob Livengood, and more participated.

Indianapolis 500 2011
In May 2011, Global Inheritance made its first appearance at the Indianapolis 500 with the Energy Playground. The project featured Tour de Energy bicycles as well as the Energy Seesaw that participants used to fuel snow cone machines. The bicycles could also be used to charge cell phones, iPods, and cameras. The re-engineered equipment showed participants the amount of energy that everyday appliances and electronics require in order to develop a heightened awareness of energy consumption among Indy 500 attendees. Similar to the group's other initiatives, the playground equipment aimed to foster a responsible relationship to the environment.

History and origins
Founded as "FashionPeace" in 2002, Global Inheritance was envisioned by Eric Ritz as "an NGO advertising agency for mother earth and the improvement of mankind." Ritz was frustrated with other environmental organizations that failed to connect with a broader audience, and wanted to create an organization that could connect with people from every walk of life.
In addition, he wanted to employ the power of music and art to inspire people, rather than focusing strictly on money as he had seen others do. Ritz wanted an organization that would bridge the gap between environmental causes and everyday people, hoping to use creativity to spark an interest in the issues and inspire action.

The early organization partnered with clothing companies and designers to re-purpose old clothing into designer outfits. Although that particular program is now only one of many, the spirit of using creativity to encourage and even glamorize sustainable living remains a foundation of the organization. Early partner companies included Diesel, Levi's, Miss Sixty, and American Apparel.

Soon, Ritz was traveling to events to install environmentally-aware performance art like the Jiffy Pop tree at Coachella, and by the summer of 2009, Global Inheritance was able to hire two paid employees for the first time. Today the organization is run by a small staff and a cadre of interns and volunteers.

Global Inheritance now runs approximately 25-30 programs a year for a variety of festivals, events, and companies.

References

External links 

 Global Inheritance Official Site 

Globalism
Non-profit organizations based in Los Angeles